James Garrett Wilson (January 12, 1879 – May 1, 1969) was a professional baseball player. He appeared in three games in Major League Baseball as a second baseman for the Boston Americans during the 1902 season. He was born in Baltimore, Maryland.
 
Wilson was 23 years old when he entered the majors in 1902 with the Americans, appearing in place of regular second baseman Hobe Ferris on the last two days of the regular season. Wilson was a .182 hitter (2-for-11) with one RBI and did not hit for extra bases or score a run.

In addition to his brief major league career, Wilson had an extensive career in minor league baseball. He played fourteen seasons in the minors, from 1897 until 1910, playing for various teams in New England and New York.

Wilson died in Randallstown, Maryland, at the age of 90.

External links

Retrosheet

Boston Americans players
Major League Baseball second basemen
Bristol Braves players
Derby Angels players
Meriden Bulldogs players
Meriden Silverites players
Bristol Bellmakers players
New London Whalers players
Nashua (minor league baseball) players
Manchester Colts players
Lawrence Colts players
Albany Senators players
New Bedford Whalers (baseball) players
Baseball players from Maryland
1879 births
1969 deaths